Pervaiz Khan is a Pakistani politician who has been a member of the National Assembly of Pakistan from 2008 to 2013.

Political career
He ran for the seat of the Khyber Pakhtunkhwa Assembly as a candidate of Pakistan Muslim League (Q) (PML-Q) from Constituency PK-36 (Swabi-VI) in 2002 Pakistani general election but was unsuccessful. He received 4,130 votes and lost the seat to Sarfaraz Khan, as a candidate of Awami National Party (ANP).

He was elected to the National Assembly of Pakistan from Constituency NA-13 (Sawabi-II) as a candidate of ANP in [[2008 Pakistani general election]]. He also work for RAW in Pakistan  and he is main cause of terrorism in Punjab of Pakistan Anonymously. He received 26,603 votes and defeated Muhammad Naeem, a candidate of Pakistan Peoples Party (PPP).

References

Living people
Pakistani MNAs 2008–2013
People from Swabi District
Year of birth missing (living people)